Victor Timothy Ward (17 September 1917 – 28 January 1993) was an English footballer and subsequently football manager, most notable for his time with Derby County.

Biography
Ward was the adopted son of Bill and Eunice Andrews and raised in Charlton Kings near Cheltenham. Tim played football on the local pitches with his childhood friend Cedric, during these games Cedric would be Arsenal and Tim would be Derby County.

He attended Charlton Kings Boys School.

Playing career

Ward played football for Cheltenham Schools and Charlton Kings before signing for Cheltenham Town who were then embarking on their first seasons in the Southern Football league. In 1937 Ward had an unsuccessful trial for Leicester City risking the sack from his job, before catching the attention of Derby County scout Jackie Whitehouse. He joined the club on trial, scoring with the first kick of his first trial match with Derby County 'A', and convinced George Jobey to pay Cheltenham £100 and became a full-time professional, playing at left half, replacing England international defender Errington Keen. Like many of his generation, Ward's career was adversely affected by the outbreak of World War II, and during his time in the army Ward made guest appearances for Notts County, Hamilton Academical and Leeds United and also played for the Scottish Army XI before he was sent to fight in Europe. After the war Ward played for the BAOR team before being demobbed. His time in Germany saw him miss all but one game of Derby's 1946 FA Cup campaign. Ward was philosophical on missing the final, saying 'So many of my friends were killed in the war and I regarded myself lucky to emerge from it, rather than unlucky to miss Wembley." On his return to England, despite Arsenal offering £10,000 for his services, Derby found him a position at right-half, where he was successful enough to gain 2 full England caps, making his debut against Belgium on 21 September 1947 at The Heysel Stadium and also appearing against Wales at Villa Park on 10 November 1948. He was also part of the FA Tour of Canada in 1950. He was sold to Barnsley in 1951, spending two years with the Tykes before entering management.

Managerial career

Ward's management career started with an 8-day stay as Exeter City manager. After being appointed manager on 4 March 1953, and despite travelling to their Third Division South match against Ipswich Town, Barnsley, who had never released Ward, recalled him on 12 March and appointed him manager two weeks later. Though he arrived too late to save Barnsley from relegation, he achieved promotion straight away as Third Division North Champions in 1955. Though Barnsley were relegated again four years later, he was still comfortably established at Oakwell until joining Grimsby in January 1960. Another promotion followed as Grimsby finished runners up in the 1961–62 Third Division, finishing just three points behind winners Portsmouth.

His success at Grimsby saw him coveted by Derby County, who appointed him manager ahead of the 1962–63 season. At the time Derby were established as a Second Division side and, after four years of finishing progressively higher in the league (18th, 13th, 9th, 8th), the club dipped to 17th in the 1966/67 season and the club decided not to renew his contract, replacing him with Brian Clough. Ward's five years at Derby were blighted by a lack of cash and a parochial attitude in the boardroom, but he is often credited with laying the foundations for the success of his successor, such as signing Colin Boulton, Peter Daniel, Kevin Hector, Alan Durban and Ron Webster, all of whom were part of Clough's 1972 Football League winning side. Ward claimed that the successful signing of Eddie Thomas for just £3,500, counted against him, saying "(Thomas) proved a marvellous bargain and after that I was expected to sign other players as cheaply." After Derby, Ward spent 15 months as manager of Carlisle United before leaving football management completely.

Post Management

Following his retirement from management, Ward ran the ex-Derby County football side and was instrumental in the formation of the Derby County Former Player's Association in 1991, becoming the first chairman. He also held a position of scout for Nottingham Forest.

Honours

As a manager
Barnsley
Third Division North champions: 1954–55

Grimsby Town
Third Division runners-up: 1961–62

Personal life
Tim married Nancy (who died in December 1992); they had one son Andrew, born 22 April 1949.

References

Bibliography

External links

England profile

1917 births
1993 deaths
English footballers
Cheltenham Town F.C. players
Derby County F.C. players
Notts County F.C. wartime guest players
Leeds United F.C. wartime guest players
Hamilton Academical F.C. wartime guest players
English Football League players
Exeter City F.C. managers
Carlisle United F.C. managers
Derby County F.C. managers
Grimsby Town F.C. managers
English Football League managers
England international footballers
Barnsley F.C. players
Association football wingers
English football managers